The 6th Vijay Awards ceremony honoring the best of Tamil film industry in 2011 was held on 16 June 2012 at the Jawaharlal Nehru Indoor Stadium in Chennai, India. The event was hosted by Gopinath and Sivakarthikeyan.

Jury
The jury members were director K. S. Ravikumar, comedian Yugi Sethu, actress Nadia Moidu, Lizy Priyadarshan and cinematographer R. Rathnavelu.

Award winners and nominees

Jury awards
Source:

Favorite Awards

References

Vijay Awards
2012 Indian film awards